Centennial Learning Center is a public alternative high school in Gresham, Oregon, United States.

Academics
In 2008, 27% of the school's seniors received their high school diploma. Of 44 students, 12 graduated, 17 dropped out, and 15 were still in high school in 2009.

References

High schools in Oregon
Alternative schools in Oregon
Public middle schools in Oregon
Public high schools in Oregon